Rutland Township is one of the twelve townships of Meigs County, Ohio, United States.  The 2000 census found 2,347 people in the township, 1,946 of whom lived in the unincorporated portions of the township.

Geography
Located in the western part of the county, it borders the following townships:
Scipio Township - north
Bedford Township - northeast corner
Salisbury Township - east
Cheshire Township, Gallia County - south
Morgan Township, Gallia County - southwest
Salem Township - west
Columbia Township - northwest corner

Two populated places are located in Rutland Township: the village of Rutland, the smallest village in Meigs County, in the center; and the unincorporated community of Langsville, in the center, a short distance west of Rutland.

Name and history
It is the only Rutland Township statewide.

Government
The township is governed by a three-member board of trustees, who are elected in November of odd-numbered years to a four-year term beginning on the following January 1. Two are elected in the year after the presidential election and one is elected in the year before it. There is also an elected township fiscal officer, who serves a four-year term beginning on April 1 of the year after the election, which is held in November of the year before the presidential election. Vacancies in the fiscal officership or on the board of trustees are filled by the remaining trustees.

References

External links
County website

Townships in Meigs County, Ohio
Townships in Ohio